Ronald Mandel Lott (born May 8, 1959) is an American former professional football player in the National Football League (NFL) for 14 seasons during the 1980s and 1990s.

Lott played college football  for the University of Southern California (USC), and was honored as a consensus All-American.  A first-round pick in the 1981 NFL Draft, he played for the San Francisco 49ers, Los Angeles Raiders, New York Jets, and Kansas City Chiefs of the NFL. Lott was inducted into the Pro Football Hall of Fame in 2000 and International Sports Hall of Fame in 2023, and is widely considered to be one of the best of all time at the safety position in NFL history and one of the best players in NFL history.

College career

Lott played for USC from 1977 to 1980.  After sitting out his freshman season, Lott made the starting lineup and recorded 3 interceptions, assisting the team to a 12–1 record and #2 ranking in the nation.  The 1978 season went even better.  Lott recorded 3 interceptions again as a key member of an elite secondary that included future NFL players Jeff Fisher, Dennis Smith, Joey Browner, and Dennis Johnson.  Together with an offense led by future hall of fame NFL players Marcus Allen and Anthony Munoz, and Heisman Trophy winner Charles White, he helped USC finish with a 11–0–1 record and a #1 ranking from the coaches poll, though they finished 2nd under the AP.  In his senior season, Lott led the nation in interceptions (8), and return yards (166) earning himself consensus All-American honors as the team went 8–2–1 with a final ranking of #11.

Professional career
Lott was selected in the first round (8th overall) of the 1981 NFL Draft by the San Francisco 49ers. The level of skill demonstrated by the 6-foot, 203-pound standout was instantly recognized, and from the very beginning of training camp he had the job as the 49ers' starting left cornerback. In his rookie season in 1981, he recorded seven interceptions, helped the 49ers to win Super Bowl XVI, and also became only the second rookie in NFL history to return three interceptions for touchdowns. His outstanding play resulted in his finishing second for rookie of the year honors, behind New York Giants linebacker Lawrence Taylor.

Lott switched to the safety position in 1985. He had the tip of his left pinky finger amputated after the 1985 season when it was crushed while tackling running back Timmy Newsome, and a bone graft surgery would not have allowed him to start the 1986 season. An injury sidelined him for the season's last two games in 1986, but he still led the league with a career-best 10 interceptions, while recording 77 tackles, three forced fumbles, and two quarterback sacks. In his 10 years with the 49ers, Lott helped them win eight division titles and four Super Bowls: XVI (1981 season), XIX (1984), XXIII (1988), and XXIV (1989).  He is one of five players that were on all four 1980s 49ers Super Bowl wins.  The other four are quarterback Joe Montana, linebacker Keena Turner, cornerback Eric Wright, and wide receiver Mike Wilson.

After his career with San Francisco, Lott signed as a free agent in 1991 with the Los Angeles Raiders, and in 1993 with the New York Jets. In 1991, he led the league in interceptions (8) for a second time. Lott signed a free-agent deal with the Kansas City Chiefs in 1995, but was injured in the preseason. He returned to the 49ers in 1995, but the injuries he had suffered over the previous four seasons continued to plague him, and he announced his retirement before the season began. He was elected to the Pro Football Hall of Fame in 2000, his first year of eligibility, and was also named to the NFL's 75th Anniversary Team in 1994 and the 100th Anniversary Team in 2019.

In his 14 NFL seasons, Lott recorded 8.5 sacks and 63 interceptions, which he returned for 730 yards and five touchdowns. He recovered 17 fumbles, returned them for 43 yards, and gained 113 yards on kickoff returns. Lott also played in 20 postseason games, recording nine interceptions, 89 tackles, one forced fumble, one fumble recovery, and two touchdowns. Additionally, he was named All-Pro eight times, All-NFC six times, and All-AFC once. Beyond statistics, Lott had an uncanny awareness of how a play was developing, which allowed him to break up passes and earn a reputation as one of the hardest and most efficient open-field tacklers in the history of the league.

NFL career statistics

Regular season

Broadcasting career
Lott turned to broadcasting following his retirement, serving as an analyst on Fox NFL Sunday in 1996 and 1997, and working on the network's game coverage in 1998. He is currently on a show called PAC-12 Playbook on the Pac-12 Network, an American sports-oriented digital cable and satellite television network. He also serves on the Board of Selectors of Jefferson Awards for Public Service.

Personal life
Lott was born in Albuquerque, New Mexico. His father served a career in the United States Air Force, retiring as a Senior master sergeant. He now lives in Cupertino, California, with his wife, Karen, and his children, Hailey, Isaiah, and Chloe. USA Today praised him as "one of the most successful athletes at making the transition to business." Along with former teammates Harris Barton and Joe Montana, Lott was a managing partner and a founder of HRJ Capital. Lott owns both Toyota and Mercedes-Benz car dealerships. He advises professional athletes who are making a transition to the business world. Lott is also the father of former Tampa Bay Buccaneers linebacker Ryan Nece. 

In 1991, Lott, along with Jill Lieber, wrote an autobiography, Total Impact. Lott inspired the Lott IMPACT Trophy, which is given annually by the Pacific Club IMPACT Foundation to college football's Defensive IMPACT Player of the Year. The trophy was first awarded in 2004. Lott was the guest of honor at a CYO fundraiser at Sharon Heights Country Club in Menlo Park, CA in May 2012 where he discussed the importance of helping the community.  Lott credits the late Coach Ben Parks as a central figure in the development of his vigorous philanthropic work.  On February 17, 2015, he was appointed to the Board of Directors of GSV Capital Corporation, a publicly traded investment fund.

See also
Bay Area Sports Hall of Fame
The Lott Trophy

References

External links

 
 
 
 

1959 births
Living people
African-American players of American football
All-American college football players
American amputees
American automobile salespeople
American football cornerbacks
American football safeties
Sportspeople with limb difference
College Football Hall of Fame inductees
Kansas City Chiefs players
Los Angeles Raiders players
National Conference Pro Bowl players
NFL Europe broadcasters
National Football League announcers
National Football League players with retired numbers
New York Jets players
Pro Football Hall of Fame inductees
San Francisco 49ers players
USC Trojans football players
Sportspeople from Rialto, California
Players of American football from California
Players of American football from Albuquerque, New Mexico
People from Cupertino, California
College Football Playoff Selection Committee members
21st-century African-American people
20th-century African-American sportspeople
Ed Block Courage Award recipients